Lodmoor is a Site of Special Scientific Interest (SSSI), RSPB reserve and country park in Dorset, England. The country park features a visitor centre, model railway and pitch and putt golf course. The SSSI has a wetland habitat with native birds that are rare in the UK and a range of migratory species.

History
The construction of a sea wall in the twentieth century has prevented regular tidal incursions, although freshwater flooding is still an occurrence, especially in winter.

Location
The site is accessible via three trails.
The SSSI is composed of reed bed, salt marsh, wet grassland and open water, and is separated from Weymouth Bay by Greenhill beach and the B3155 road.

Site of special scientific interest
The site includes a Royal Society for the Protection of Birds nature reserve. Some nationally rare bird species breed there, and it is also visited by some uncommon migratory waders.

Birds breeding at Lodmoor include bearded tit, Cetti's warbler, marsh warbler and Savi's warbler. A wide variety of migratory waders visit, including northern lapwing, common snipe, wood sandpiper, green sandpiper, spotted redshank and Eurasian whimbrel. Visitors belonging to uncommon species of wader include jack snipe, greenshank and ruff.

There are also populations of two rare insects, short-winged conehead and lesser marsh grasshopper.

Country park

The facilities at the country park include a cafe, visitors centre, picnic tables and barbecue stands, a grassed events area for a variety of events including car rallies, summer fayres and circus shows. There is an outdoor gym and a 2 km walking trail, children's play areas, a Sea Life Centre, a mini-golf course, a Model World, a Go-Kart circuit and Bumper Boats, a model railway, 9-Hole pitch and putt golf course and a Parkrun.

References

External links
 English Nature website (SSSI information)
 Official country park website

Sites of Special Scientific Interest in Dorset
Sites of Special Scientific Interest notified in 1952
Royal Society for the Protection of Birds reserves in England
National nature reserves in England
Nature reserves in Dorset
Environment of Dorset
Geography of Weymouth, Dorset
Tourist attractions in Weymouth, Dorset